Jean-Baptiste Maquet (born 6 February 1922) is a Belgian fencer. He competed in the individual and team épée events at the 1952 Summer Olympics.

References

External links
 

1922 births
Possibly living people
Belgian male fencers
Belgian épée fencers
Olympic fencers of Belgium
Fencers at the 1952 Summer Olympics